The following is the discography of the Japanese experimental band Boris.

Studio albums

Live albums
Boris Archive 3CD (2005 aRCHIVE)
Smile -Live at Wolf Creek- 2CD (2008 Diwphalanx Records)
Smile -Live in Prague 2LP (2009 Conspiracy Records†)
Boris / Variations + Live in Japan CD + DVD (2010 Daymare Recordings / DIWPHALANX)
Archive II (2014 Daymare)
Crossing Waltz (2016 FangsAnalSatan)
eternity (2018 FangsAnalSatan)

EPs, singles and demos
"Demo Vol. 1" 2x Cassette (1993, FangsAnalSatan)
"Demo Vol. 3" Cassette (1994, FangsAnalSatan)
"1970" 7-inch (2002, Inoxia Records)
"A Bao A Qu" 7-inch picture disc (2005, SuperFi Records)
"Statement" 7-inch (2008, Southern Lord Records)
"Message" 12-inch (2008, Diwphalanx Records)
"Japanese Heavy Rock Hits v1-4" 7-inch (2009, Southern Lord Records)
"Black Original Remix" 12-inch (2011, Catune)
"Looprider Remix" 12-inch (2012, Catune)
"Cosmos" 3x file (2012, Invada)
Mr. Shortkill 12-inch (2016, Daymare Recordings)
"Phenomenons Drive" 12-inch (2018, Hello From The Gutter)
Tears E.P. CD (2019, Trash-Up!! Records)
"Boris" 12-inch (2020, Fangs Anal Satan)
"Heavy Rocks" 7-inch (2022, KiliKiliVilla)
"Pink" 7-inch (2022, KiliKiliVilla)
"Smile" 7-inch (2022, KiliKiliVilla)
"New Album" 7-inch (2022, KiliKiliVilla)
"Kuruimizu" 7-inch flexi (2022, Fangs Anal Satan / Wake Brewing)
"Noise" 7-inch (2022, KiliKiliVilla)
"Dear" 7-inch (2022, KiliKiliVilla)
"Christmas" 7-inch + box (2022, KiliKiliVilla)

Concert films/Music videos
Music videos have been produced for several of Boris' songs, usually by the Japanese production company Foodunited.
"Hama"
"Kuruimizu"
"Ibitsu"
"Furi"
"Korosu"
"1970"
"A Bao A Qu"
"The Evil One Which Sobs (Remix)"
"Pink"
"Rainbow"
"Statement"
"My Neighbour Satan"
"Hope/Riot Sugar"
"The Power"
"Absolutego"
"Dōshitemo Anata o Yurusenai"
"Love"
"Shadow of Skull"
"Anti-Gone"
"鏡 -Zerkalo-"
"Reincarnation Rose"
"Drowning By Numbers"
"Beyond Good & Evil"

Collaborations

Merzbow collaborations
Boris have a well-established history of collaboration with Japanoise artist Merzbow. Thus far, three of the collaborations with Merzbow have been full-length albums, one of them is a 12-inch EP, and the last two are live albums.

Megatone CD (2002 Inoxia Records)
04092001 LP (2004 Inoxia Records)
Sun Baked Snow Cave CD (2005 Hydra Head Records)
Walrus/Groon 12-inch EP (2007 Hydra Head Records)
Rock Dream 2CD/3LP (2007 Diwphalanx Records/Southern Lord Records)
Klatter LP (2011 Daymare Records)
Gensho CD/LP (2016 Relapse/Daymare)
2R0I2P0 CD/LP (2020 Relapse)

Other collaborations
Black: Implication Flooding (with Keiji Haino) CD (1998 Inoxia Records)
Altar (with Sunn O)))) CD/2CD/3LP (2006 Southern Lord Records/Inoxia Records/Daymare Records)
Rainbow (with Michio Kurihara) CD (2006/2007 Pedal Records/Drag City)
Cloud Chamber (with Michio Kurihara) CD (2008 Pedal Records)
BXI EP (with Ian Astbury) CD/LP (2010 Southern Lord Records)
EROS (with Endon) Cassette (2015 fangsanalsatan/New Noise Literacy)/LP (2016 Daymare Recordings)
Low End Meeting (with GOTH-TRAD) CD/12" (2015 fangsanalsatan)
Refrain (with Z.O.A) CD/LP (2020 Fangs Anal Satan)

Split recordings
Boris/Barebones Split EP – 10-inch/CD (1996, Piranha Records/Fangsanalsatan)
Boris/Tomsk 7 Split EP – 7-inch (1997, Bovine Records)
More Echoes, Touching Air Landscape – (with Choukoku no Niwa) CD (1999, Inoxia Records)
Boris/The Dudley Corporation Split EP – 7-inch (2003, Scientific Labs)
Long Hair and Tights – (with Doomriders) 2LP (2007, Daymare Recordings)
Damaged split EP + DVD – (with Stupid Babies Go Mad) 10-inch (2007, Diwphalanx Records)
She's So Heavy – Wata/Ai Aso split 7-inch (2007, Diwphalanx Records)
Chapter Ahead Being Fake – Torche/Boris split 10-inch/CD (2010/2009, Hydra Head/Daymare Recording)
Golden Dance Classics – 9dw/Boris split vinyl and CD (2009, Catune)
Boris/Saade – Boris/Saade split vinyl 12-inch (2011, KYEO)
Asobi Seksu x Boris – Asobi Seksu/Boris split vinyl 7-inch (2012, Sargent House)
Boris/Joe Volk – Boris/Joe Volk split vinyl 12-inch (2012, Invada)
Boris/Heap Split Single – 7-inch (2014, Baked Goods)
Rocky & The Sweden/Boris - split EP (2022, Relapse Records)

Video releases
Hama VHS Promo (1998 Foodunited)
Live at Shimokitazawa Shelter DVD (2003 Diwphalanx Records)
Bootleg -Feedbacker- DVD (2005 Diwphalanx Records)
Heavy Metal Me DVD (2005 Diwphalanx Records)
Live in Japan DVD (2011 Southern Lord)

Other releases
Wizard's Convention: Japanese Heavy Rock Showcase – DVD (2005 Diwphalanx Records)
Buzz In A.V/Scion Remix – (promo with Todd Edward, Mixhell, Optimo, NosaijThing; 2009 A.V/Scion)
Statement Promo CD – promo (2008 Inoxia Records)
1985 – compilation of studio outtakes from 2011 (2019 Fangs Anal Satan)

Compilation appearances

Exclusive songs
These songs are available only on the compilations.
"Water Porch" on Take Care of Scabbard Fish CD (1994 Scabbard Fish)
The above song was actually Boris' recorded debut.
"Mosquito" (studio version) on Eat the Chaos CD (1995 Thank You Record Co.)
"Vacuuum" on From Koenji to Eternity CD (1996 Inoxia)
"Me and the Devil Blues" on Up Jumped the Devil: Tribute to Robert Johnson CD (2000 P-Vine)
"Dronevil" on Mangrove2002 CD (2002 Mangrove)
"Froggie Bee Baa" on Merzbow: Frog Remixed & Revisited 2CD (2003 Misanthropic Agenda)
"You Were Holding An Umbrella" (live 10/16/07 at Echoplex, LA) on Invocation of Sacred Resonance I (2008 Southern Lord Records)
"Slither" on  Doggy Style: The Dogs Tribute 2xCD (2008 Future Now)
"Slither (Alternative Version)" on  Doggy Style: The Dogs Tribute 2xCD (2008 Future Now)
"Blood Swamp (Tloc Edit)" on  Limits of Control [SOUNDTRACK]  CD (2009 Lakeshore Records)
"(Tloc Edit)" on  Limits of Control [SOUNDTRACK]  CD (2009 Lakeshore Records)
"Sometimes" on Yellow Loveless [Tribute to My Bloody Valentine] CD (2013 High Fader Records)
"Lithium" (originally by Nirvana; tribute album Whatever Nevermind) (2015, Robotic Empire)

Samplers
These are tracks taken from other Boris albums.
"Huge" on Let There Be Doom CD (2003 Southern Lord Records)  Originally from Amplifier Worship
"A Bao A Qu" on Darkness Hath No Boundaries CD (2006 Southern Lord Records) Originally from Mabuta no Ura
"A Bao A Qu" and "Etna" on Darkness Knows No Boundaries CD (2006 Southern Lord Records) Originally from Mabuta no Ura and Altar (with Sunn O)))) respectively
"The Sinking Belle (Blue Sheep)" on Mind The Gap Vol. 65 CD (2006 Gonzo Circus) Originally from Altar (with Sunn O))))
"My Machine" on Walkabout CD (2007 Endless Flight) Originally from Pink
"Farewell" on Within the Church of Thee Overlords CD (2007 Southern Lord Records) Originally from Pink

References

External links
 Boris discography at AllMusic
 
 

Heavy metal group discographies
Discographies of Japanese artists